Robert Lee Sneddon (July 9, 1921 – January 24, 2012) was an American football running back in the National Football League for the Washington Redskins and the Detroit Lions. Sneddon also played in the All-America Football Conference for the Los Angeles Dons. He played college football at St. Mary's College of California and was drafted in the tenth round of the 1944 NFL Draft. Sneddon died in Sandy, Utah in 2012 at the age of 90.

References

1921 births
2012 deaths
American football running backs
Detroit Lions players
Los Angeles Dons players
Sportspeople from Ogden, Utah
Washington Redskins players
Saint Mary's Gaels football players
Players of American football from Utah